Lago di San Casciano is a lake in the Province of Siena, Tuscany, Italy. At an elevation of 383 m, its surface area is 2 km².

Geography
The lake is located in south of the municipality of San Casciano dei Bagni, near the borders with Lazio and the village of Trevinano.

Lakes of Tuscany
Province of Siena
San Casciano dei Bagni